KBAR may refer to:

 KBAR-FM, a radio station (100.9 FM) licensed to Victoria, Texas, United States
 KBAR (AM), a radio station (1230 AM) licensed to Burley, Idaho, United States